The Making of Me  is a 60-minute miniseries on the BBC on BBC One, the first season was in 2008. As of 7 August 2008, there have been three episodes.

Episode list
John Barrowman - John Barrowman challenges scientists to explain why he is gay. (24 July 2008)
Colin Jackson - Athlete Colin Jackson and scientists try to discover the secrets of his talents. (31 July 2008)
Vanessa-Mae - Violinist Vanessa-Mae asks if science can explain the secret of her success. (7 August 2008)

External links
 
 

2008 British television series debuts
2008 British television series endings
BBC Television shows
2000s British documentary television series
2000s British television miniseries
English-language television shows